Crematogaster acaciae is a species of ant in tribe Crematogastrini. It was described by Forel in 1892.

References

acaciae
Insects described in 1892